Xiangyang Subdistrict is a subdistrict of the Xunyang District, in the Jiujiang city,  Jiangxi, China, located in Jiujiang Economic and Technological Development Zone. , it has 8 residential communities and 7 villages under its administration.

See also 
 List of township-level divisions of Jiangxi

References 

Township-level divisions of Jiangxi
Jiujiang